Muhammad Ibrahim of Ujani (1863 – 1943) was a Bengali Deobandi scholar and founder of the Jamia Islamia Ibrahimia. He was a senior disciple of Rashid Ahmad Gangohi, and his khalifa Syed Muhammad Ishaq was the founder of the Charmonai Darbar.

Early life and education
Ibrahim was born in 1863, to a Bengali Muslim family in the village of Nalua in Noakhali, Bengal Presidency. His father's name was Muhammad Panah Mian. His primary education began in his own neighbourhood, where he studied Arabic and Persian. He later studied at the Calcutta Alia Madrasa, before enrolling at the Madrasah as-Sawlatiyah in Mecca, Arabia. In Mecca, he studied qiraʼat under the Turkish scholar Qari Baraksus.

Career

Whilst in Mecca, Ibrahim's recitation of the Qur'an was heard by the governor of Mecca who instructed him to become a teacher at Madrasah as-Sawlatiyah. Ibrahim served there for 12 years as a teacher. He later returned to Bengal, where he settled in Chandpur, where one of his wives was from. In 1901, he established a mosque and the Jamia Islamia Ibrahimia in Ujani. He also pledged bay'ah to Rashid Ahmad Gangohi. 12 days later, Gangohi granted Ibrahim the khilafah (mystic succession).

Death and legacy
Ujani died in his home in Kachua, Chandpur in 1943. He was married to a woman from Mecca during his time as a teacher there, who joined him when he returned to Bengal. He was also married to girl from Daulatpur whose father had heard him reciting at a Quranic event there. He had 11 sons and 7 daughters. His disciple, Syed Muhammad Ishaq, was the founder of the Charmonai Darbar.

References 

 
 
 
 
 
 

20th-century Muslim scholars of Islam
Hanafi fiqh scholars
Sunni Muslim scholars of Islam
1943 deaths
1863 births
Deobandis
People from Noakhali District
People from Chandpur District
19th-century Bengalis
20th-century Bengalis
Bengali Muslim scholars of Islam